Class 44 may refer to:

British Rail Class 44
DRG Class 44, a Deutsche Reichsbahn German steam locomotive type